Arenillas Ecological Reserve is a  protected area in Ecuador situated in the El Oro Province, in the Arenillas Canton and in the Huaquillas Canton. 

Known mammals in the reserve, according to a 1993 study include the Sechuran fox (Lycalopex sechurae), the nine-banded armadillo (Dasypus novemcinctus), Robinson's mouse opossum (Marmosa robinsoni), the Pacific spiny-rat (Proechimys decumamus), the jaguarundi (Puma yagouaroundi), the tayra (Eira barbara), the greater bulldog bat, the common vampire bat (Desmodus rotundus), the crab-eating raccoon (Procyon cancrivorus) and the Guayaquil squirrel (Sciurus stramineus). There are also 153 species of birds of which 35% are endemic. The reserve is a BirdLife International IBA with the following endangered birds: grey-cheeked parakeet (Brotogeris pyrrhoptera), slaty becard (Pachyramphus spodiurus), and blackish-headed spinetail (Synallaxis tithys).

The region is managed by the ministry of defense and visitors must get permission from them to visit the area.

References

External links 
 Arenillas Ecological Reserve (Spanish)
 Arenillas Guide (Spanish)
 Reserva Ecológica Arenillas IBA Fact Sheet BirdLife International (Spanish)

Nature reserves in Ecuador
Geography of El Oro Province
Protected areas established in 2001
2001 establishments in Ecuador